"Good for Me" is a song by American singer-songwriter Amy Grant, released as the sixth overall single from her Heart in Motion album. It was her fourth consecutive top-five Adult Contemporary single and top-10 Hot 100 single in the United States, reaching numbers four and eight, respectively. In the United Kingdom, it peaked at number 60.

Composition
The song is in major scale and uses the subtonic chord. Grant included Mario Andretti's name in the lyrics, and subsequently was invited to sit in the Andretti family skybox at the 1992 Indianapolis 500.

Music videos
Two music videos exist for "Good for Me". In the original video clip, Amy Grant frolicks and dances with another female, who was meant to be portrayed as a childhood friend of Grant's. However, once the video was completed, Grant reportedly felt that her intended message was lost and that the video had been edited in a way to make it appear as though she and her friend were lovers. The original version of the video was directed by D.J. Webster and edited by Scott C. Wilson.

Grant enlisted the help of actor/model Jme Stein, who had played her boyfriend in the video for "Baby Baby," to shoot a new video clip for "Good for Me". The new clip for the song was also directed by D.J. Webster. The second version depicts Grant dealing with her boyfriend's popularity with women. The original "Good for Me" video did appear on first pressings of the companion VHS video compilation to Heart in Motion, but only the second video was featured on the 2004 DVD collection Greatest Videos 1986–2004.

Track listings
UK CD1
 "Good for Me" (7-inch Good for You mix)
 "Good for Me" (7-inch So Good mix)
 "Good for Me" (Dub So Good mix)
 "Good for Me" (7-inch You Like to Dance mix)

UK CD2
 "Good for Me" (7-inch Good for You mix)
 "Good for Me" (12-inch You Like to Dance mix)
 "Good for Me" (You Like to Dub mix)
 "Good for Me" (album version)

Personnel
 Amy Grant – lead vocals 
 Keith Thomas – synthesizers, bass, drum and percussion programming, backing vocals 
 Brian Tankersley – additional synthesizer programming
 Jerry McPherson – guitars
 Mark Hammond – drum and percussion programming
 Ron Hemby – backing vocals
 Donna McElroy – backing vocals

Charts

Weekly charts

Year-end charts

Release history

References

Amy Grant songs
1991 songs
1992 singles
A&M Records singles
Song recordings produced by Keith Thomas (record producer)
Songs written by Amy Grant
Songs written by Jay Gruska
Songs written by Tom Snow
Songs written by Wayne Kirkpatrick